"Dry County" is a song by American rock band Bon Jovi. It was released on March 7, 1994, as the sixth and final single from their fifth studio album, Keep the Faith (1992). It was written by Jon Bon Jovi. Clocking in at 9 minutes and 52 seconds, "Dry County" is the longest song that Bon Jovi has ever recorded on a studio album. A shorter 6-minute version reached number nine on the UK Singles Chart and number six in Finland. It was not released in the United States or Canada.

Lyrical interpretation
"Dry County" is about the decline of the U.S. domestic oil industry and its effect on those whose income relied on it. In live versions of the song, during the buildup to the second guitar solo, Jon Bon Jovi often includes a monologue about the struggles of life generally.

Song structure
"Dry County" is an epic ballad that contains several rises, climaxes, and instrumental solos, in the vein of such long rock epics as "Free Bird", "Child in Time", "Stairway to Heaven", "Telegraph Road", "I Want You (She's So Heavy)", "Bohemian Rhapsody", "New York City Serenade", "Jungleland" and "November Rain".

Live performances
Although "Dry County" is considered a fan favorite, it was only played regularly on the Keep the Faith Tour. On May 13, 2006, Bon Jovi played "Dry County" live at the first concert of the summer leg of their Have a Nice Day Tour in Düsseldorf, it was the first time it had been played live in 10 years, and went on to be performed on further occasions on that tour and on the band's more recent Lost Highway Tour. The band's followers often display signs requesting the song. It was also performed during The Circle Tour and Because We Can Tour. It was performed once on the This House Is Not for Sale Tour in 2018 at the Allentown, Pennsylvania show.

Track listings

UK 7-inch and cassette single
 "Dry County" – 9:36
 "Stranger in This Town" (live)

UK CD1
 "Dry County" (edit)
 "Stranger in This Town" (live)
 "Blood Money" (live)

UK CD2
 "Dry County" (live)
 "It's Only Rock 'n' Roll" (live)
 "Waltzing Matilda" (live)

European and Australian CD single
 "Dry County" (edit) – 6:37
 "Dry County" – 9:36

Japanese CD single
 "Dry County" (edit)
 "Stranger in This Town" (live)
 "Blood Money" (live)
 "Dry County" (live)
 "It's Only Rock 'n' Roll" (live)
 "Waltzing Matilda" (live)

Charts

References

1992 songs
1994 singles
Bon Jovi songs
Mercury Records singles
Song recordings produced by Bob Rock
Songs written by Jon Bon Jovi
Vertigo Records singles